The ECAC Hockey Tournament is the conference tournament for ECAC Hockey.  The winner of the tournament received an automatic berth into the NCAA Tournament which has occurred every year the NCAA has allowed automatic berths into the tournament. The ECAC tournament champion has only once not received an invitation to the NCAA tournament, that coming in 1963 when Harvard won its first conference championship (the second year in existence for the ECAC).

The tournament was first held in 1962, the first year of conference play. It was held at Boston Arena in Boston from 1962–66. It then moved to the much larger Boston Garden From 1967–92 (capacity for ice hockey games was 14,000+ in the Garden as opposed to the ~4,000 at the Arena). Because of a schism that occurred in the ECAC in 1984 that saw most Boston-area schools break away and form the Hockey East conference in 1984, the championship rounds moved to the Olympic Arena in Lake Placid, New York for the next decade (1993–2002). From 2003–2010, along with a change to the tournament format, the semifinal and championship games were moved to the Pepsi Arena in Albany, New York which changed its name to the 'Times Union Center' in 2007. From 2011 thru 2013 the final four games were held at the Boardwalk Hall in Atlantic City, New Jersey and afterwards it was announced that the 2014 championship would return to Lake Placid and play at the since renamed Herb Brooks Arena.

ECAC Hockey Men's Ice Hockey Tournament champions

Formats
 1962
The ECAC Hockey Tournament format begins as a single-game elimination three-round format featuring the top eight teams in the standings.

 1983
The quarterfinal round is changed to a two-game format where if the two teams are tied afterwards a 'mini-game' is held to determine who advances. Overtime is not played in the quarterfinals outside the 'mini-games'

 1990
Two preliminary games are added to determine the final two qualifiers in the tournament played between the teams that finished seventh thru tenth in the standings.

 1992
The quarterfinal round was changed to a single-elimination format.

 1993
The quarterfinal round was converted into a modified best-of-three series where the first team to receive three points would advance (2 points for a win 1 point for a tie) with only the third game permitted to continue past a 5-minute overtime if the score was still tied.

 1998
The preliminary round was scrapped and the quarterfinal round expanded into 5 modified best-of-three series. The two lowest-seeded teams to advance out of the quarterfinals would then play in a single 'Four vs. Five' game to determine the final semifinalist.

 2000
The quarterfinal round was altered to include standard best-of-three series with no ties allowed.

 2003
ECAC Hockey adds a fourth round to the tournament (called the 'First Round') and includes all 12 conference teams in the tournament. The First round pits the fifth thru twelfth teams in the standings in four best-of-three series with the winners advancing to the quarterfinals. The top four teams in the standings automatically advance to the quarterfinal round and play the remaining four teams in reverse order of their finish in the standings in a second best-of-three round. The semifinal, third-place and championship games are all single-elimination.

2014
The third place game is eliminated.

2021
Due to the COVID-19 pandemic, only four competing institutions will compete in a single-elimination championship over the course of one championship weekend.

2023

After 20 years, the opening round of the tournament gets changed to single-elimination, replacing the best-of-three format prior; the quarterfinals remain best-of-three, however, along with the semifinals and final both being single games.

Championship appearances

By school
As of March 2023

By coach

Formation
In 1961 an argument over which two eastern teams were to be selected to the NCAA tournament precipitated the formation of an eastern conference who would automatically send its tournament champion to the national tournament. The 1961-62 season saw the first iteration of the ECAC with a total of 28 teams, including the three teams that were concurrent members of the Tri-State League until its dissolution in 1972 (Clarkson, Rensselaer and St. Lawrence). After three years and the addition of a 29th team, the conference was split into two tiers. The top tier included all of the Ivy League schools as well as the higher profile programs. While the NCAA tournament selections were not codified and resolved until 1982, the ECAC tournament champion was nevertheless invited to & played for the national championship every year except 1963 when Harvard passed on the invitation and the league was represented by Boston College and Clarkson who finished second and third in the tournament respectively.

Schism
In response to a threat from the Ivy League schools to split from the conference over scheduling disagreements, the six teams that comprised the East Division left the conference to form Hockey East. ECAC Hockey still contained eleven teams after the break and was able to retain its automatic bid to the tournament, a necessity for the stability of a conference.

Succeeding Years
ECAC Hockey has remained operating as a 12-team conference since the start of 1984-85, adding Union when Army left in 1991 and Quinnipiac when Vermont left in 2005. The stability of the ECAC throughout the years is exemplified by its being the only Division I conference to be unaffected by the seismic shift in conference realignment that occurred due to the addition of the Big Ten Conference starting in 2013–14 and caused the founding of the National Collegiate Hockey Conference with the dissolution of the Central Collegiate Hockey Association

References

External links
The Official Site of ECAC Hockey